Carole Anne Estabrooks  (born 1954) is a Canadian applied health services researcher. She is a Canada Research Chair in Knowledge Translation and a professor in the Faculty of Nursing at the University of Alberta. She has been listed amongst the highest cited researchers in her field and was appointed a Member of the Order of Canada in 2016.

Early life and education
Estabrooks was born in 1954 to parents Louise and Francis. She attended the University of New Brunswick for her Bachelor of Nursing degree in 1977, and later earned her Master of Nursing and PhD at the University of Alberta.

Career
After completing her Postdoctoral Fellowship at the Institute for Clinical Evaluative Sciences and University of Toronto Estabrooks joined the Faculty of Nursing at the University of Alberta. She was appointed a  Canada Research Chair (CRC) in Knowledge Translation from 2005 until 2010, during which she co-founded TREC (Translating Research in Elder Care) with Peter Norton to research and quantify data on patient outcomes. TREC conducted randomized controlled trials, longitudinal studies, and network studies to improve care and quality of life in long-term care resident homes. As a result of her efforts in patient care, she was elected a Fellow of the Canadian Academy of Health Sciences and given an Alumni Award of Distinction from the University of New Brunswick. In 2009, Estabrooks, Sharon Straus, and Jeremy Grimshaw received a $1.8 million Canadian Institutes of Health Research (CIHR) grant to fund Knowledge Translation Canada: A CIHR Strategic Training Initiative in Health Research. Their research project aimed to create a national training initiative to enhance Knowledge Translation research. Through TREC, Estabrooks, Janet E. Squires, Greta G. Cummings, Judy M. Birdsell, and Peter G. Norton developed the Alberta Context Tool (ACT), a way to measure the organizational context for healthcare settings. By 2013, the ACT was used in nine countries and six languages.

Upon the conclusion of her Tier 2 CRC in Knowledge Translation, Estabrooks was re-appointed to a Tier 1 Canada Research Chair in Knowledge Translation and received the Confederation of Alberta Faculty Associations Distinguished Academic Award. She was also elected a Fellow of the American Academy of Nursing and appointed to the Alzheimer Society of Canada's Culture Change in Long Term Care Homes Steering Committee. By 2014, Estabrooks was listed amongst the highest cited researchers in her field and awarded the CIHR Betty Havens Prize for Knowledge Translation in Aging. Two years later, she was appointed a Member of the Order of Canada for "translating research into health care improvements for older Canadians."

In 2018, Estabrooks and Andrea Gruneir received $512,551 from the CIHR in funding for their project Longitudinal Monitoring for Quality of Care at the End of Life in Nursing Homes. She was also inducted into the International Nurse Researcher Hall of Fame.

References

External links

Living people
Academic staff of the University of Alberta
Canada Research Chairs
Members of the Order of Canada
Fellows of the Canadian Academy of Health Sciences
Fellows of the American Academy of Nursing
1954 births